Union Township is one of the fourteen townships of Auglaize County, Ohio, United States. The 2010 census found 1,902 people in the township, 1,680 of whom lived in the unincorporated portions of the township.

Geography
Located in the northeastern part of the county, it borders the following townships:
Perry Township, Allen County – north
Auglaize Township, Allen County – northeast corner
Wayne Township – east
Goshen Township – southeast
Clay Township – south
Pusheta Township – southwest corner
Duchouquet Township – west

The unincorporated communities of Saint Johns and Uniopolis lie in the township's west and southwest respectively.

Name and history
It is one of twenty-seven Union Townships statewide.

The township was formed in 1836, while still part of Allen County.  One of its earliest settlers was Hugh T. Rinehart, who immigrated to the township in 1839.  His house is still in existence; it has been designated a historic site.

Government
The township is governed by a three-member board of trustees, who are elected in November of odd-numbered years to a four-year term beginning on the following January 1. Two are elected in the year after the presidential election and one is elected in the year before it. There is also an elected township fiscal officer, who serves a four-year term beginning on April 1 of the year after the election, which is held in November of the year before the presidential election. Vacancies in the fiscal officership or on the board of trustees are filled by the remaining trustees.

Public services
The Wapakoneta City School District encompasses a large part of the township, with the eastern third served by the Waynesfield-Goshen Local School District.

The most of the township is served by the Wapakoneta (45895) post office, with the eastern third served by the Waynesfield (45896) post office. Uniopolis (45888) and Saint Johns (45884) maintain post offices.

References

External links
County website

Townships in Auglaize County, Ohio
Townships in Ohio
1836 establishments in Ohio
Populated places established in 1836